Upper Breinton is a village in Herefordshire, England. It is located in the civil parish of Breinton.

References

Villages in Herefordshire